

Incumbents 

 President: Ibrahim Traoré
 Prime Minister: Apollinaire Joachim Kyélem de Tambèla
 President of the Patriotic Movement for Safeguard and Restoration: Ibrahim Traoré

Events

January–March 

 3 January – Twenty-eight civilians are found dead in the town of Nouna, in northwest Burkina Faso. Burkinabe human rights groups allege that the killings were perpetrated by pro-government militia VDP on December 15, 18, and 22.
 11 January – Nine Ahmadi Muslims are killed by Wahhabi Islamist terrorists in local Ahmadi mosque in Mahdi Abad, a village near the town of Dori.
 20 January – The Burkina Faso Armed Forces rescue 62 women and four babies kidnapped by jihadists in Arbinda, Sahel Region, on January 15.
 21 January – Burkina Faso demands that French forces withdraw from its territory after suspending a 2018 military accord that allowed the presence of French troops in the country. The ruling military junta has given France one month to complete the withdrawal.
 25 January – France agrees to withdraw its 400 special forces from Burkina Faso, following the Saturday mandate from the ruling military junta that they withdraw within a month.
 10 February – Médecins Sans Frontières (MSF) suspends its operations in north-west Burkina Faso following the killings of two of its Burkinabe aid workers near Dédougou.

References 

 
Burkina Faso
Burkina Faso
2020s in Burkina Faso
Years of the 21st century in Burkina Faso